Interstate 80 (I-80) traverses the northern portion of the US state of Nevada. The freeway serves the Reno metropolitan area and passes through the towns of Fernley, Lovelock, Winnemucca, Battle Mountain, Carlin, Elko, Wells, and West Wendover on its way through the state.

I-80 follows the historical routes of the California Trail, first transcontinental railroad and Feather River Route throughout portions of Nevada. Throughout the entire state, I-80 follows the historical routes of the Victory Highway, State Route 1 (SR 1), and US Route 40 (US 40). The freeway corridor follows the paths of the Truckee and Humboldt rivers. These rivers have been used as a transportation corridor since the California Gold Rush of the 1840s.

The Nevada portion of I-80 has been designated as the Dwight D. Eisenhower Highway and Purple Heart Trail.

Route description

Truckee River

I-80 enters Nevada in the canyon of the Truckee River, paralleling the California Trail and first transcontinental railroad. Upon exiting the canyon, the freeway serves the Truckee Meadows, a name for the urban area consisting of Verdi, Reno, and Sparks. The freeway passes north of downtown Reno in a depressed alignment before intersecting I-580/US 395. The interchange with US 395 is the busiest portion, averaging 122,000 vehicles per day in 2006. The freeway passes through downtown Sparks via a viaduct over the casino floor of the Nugget Casino Resort. After leaving the Reno metropolitan area, the freeway resumes following the Truckee River in a canyon to Fernley and passes the Northern Nevada Veterans Cemetery to the north. Traffic volumes drop to 26,600 vehicles per day by Fernley and continue dropping to 8,400 by the time the freeway reaches the center of the state. The freeway exits the Truckee River corridor near Wadsworth.

Lahontan Valley/Forty Mile Desert

Past Wadsworth, the freeway cuts across the Lahontan Valley. The Lahontan Valley is a barren desert, sometimes called the Forty Mile Desert, from the era of the California Trail. The name comes from the California Gold Rush where the emigrants who came into the Lahontan Valley via the Humboldt River. The travelers would have then to endure  without usable water while crossing the valley, regardless of which of the two routes across the valley the travelers followed. I-80 closely approximates the path of the emigrants between the Humboldt and Truckee rivers.

A marker stands at a rest area on the eastern edge of the valley, near the junction of I-80 and US 95, that honors travelers who suffered crossing the valley, thousands of whom abandoned possessions, animals, and even loved ones in the desert. Per the marker, this portion was the most dreaded portion of the California Trail.

Humboldt River

For the next , I-80 follows the Humboldt River. Along the way, the freeway passes through the towns of Lovelock, Winnemucca, Battle Mountain, Carlin, Elko, and Wells. At Winnemucca, I-80 is joined by the Feather River Route; I-80 runs parallel to this railroad until the Utah state line.

The freeway is within visual distance of the river for most of this run. However, there are portions where the freeway bypasses bends by cutting across or tunneling under mountains along the canyon walls. Between Winnemucca and Battle Mountain, the freeway bypasses bends via side canyons and Golconda Summit, . The highway also bypasses Palisade Canyon, between Beowawe and Carlin, via Emigrant Pass, . Just east of Carlin, I-80 passes through the Carlin Tunnel to bypass curves of the river in the Carlin Canyon (between the Carlin Tunnel and Elko).

Eastern Nevada

After Wells, I-80 departs the Humboldt River, first transcontinental railroad, and California Trail. From this point east, the freeway follows the routes of the Hastings Cutoff, Feather River Route, former US 40, and SR 1. The freeway cuts across two mountain ranges before arriving at the Great Salt Lake Desert. After crossing these mountains, the freeway arrives at West Wendover where the freeway enters both Utah and the Great Salt Lake Desert at the Bonneville Salt Flats.

Overlaps
Portions of I-80 run concurrently with three US Routes in Nevada:
 US 95 Alternate (US 95 Alt), which runs concurrently with I-80 between Fernley and Trinity Junction near Lovelock.
 US 95, which runs concurrently with I-80 between Trinity Junction and Winnemucca.
 US 93 Alt, which runs concurrently with I-80 between the cities of Wells and West Wendover.

History

California Trail

The general route of I-80 was first used by California-bound travelers and was called the California Trail. From the Utah state line west to the Humboldt River, I-80 follows a modified routing of a lesser used branch of the trail called Hastings Cutoff. The cutoff rejoins the main route of the trail in the Humboldt River canyon. Through this portion of Nevada, the main route of the California Trail ran north of modern SR 233.

From Elko west to Lovelock, I-80 faithfully follows the California Trail. West of Lovelock, in the middle of the Humboldt Sink, the California Trail again splits into two branches. These branches, the Carson River route and the Truckee River route, are named for the waterways that guide each branch up the Sierra Nevada. I-80 follows the Truckee route, the Carson route is approximated by US 95, US 50, US 395, and SR 88/California State Route 88.

Transcontinental railroads

The route of modern I-80 was also previously used for the construction of two transcontinental railroads. The first transcontinental railroad, completed in 1869, closely follows the main line of the California Trail and I-80 west of Wells. The Feather River Route was constructed in 1909 and generally follows the Hastings Cutoff through Eastern Nevada. It also runs parallel to I-80 in Nevada east of Winnemucca.

Highways
The first paved road across this portion of Nevada was the Victory Highway, designated in Nevada as SR 1. With the formation of the US Numbered Highway System, this route was numbered US 40. From the formation of the Interstate Highway System, the highway was gradually upgraded to Interstate Highway standards and signed as I-80. In 1974, officials in Utah initiated meetings with officials in Nevada and California to truncate the route of US 91. By that time, US 91 was mostly redundant with I-15. Nevada officials agreed and further suggested that both US 91 and US 40 be truncated. Nevada officials recommended the changes occur in 1975, when the last Nevada piece of I-15 was expected to be completed. The 1976 edition of the official highway map for Nevada was the first not showing the US 40 designation. Even though the US Route designation was removed, the freeway was not yet completed. The last piece of I-80 in Nevada to be finished was the Lovelock bypass which started construction in 1981. The 1982 Official Nevada Highway Map was the first to note I-80 as a contiguous freeway across the state. All of the business loops for I-80 in Nevada use the historical route of US 40.

I-80 is also known in Nevada as the Dwight D. Eisenhower Highway after the former president of the same name and the Purple Heart Trail after such military decoration.

Future
There are plans to widen I-80 to three lanes in both directions from Vista Boulevard and Greg Street to SR 439 south (USA Parkway).

Exit list

See also

Notes

References

External links

 Interstate 80 in Nevada @ AARoads

80
 Nevada
U.S. Route 40
California Trail
80
Transportation in Washoe County, Nevada
Transportation in Storey County, Nevada
Transportation in Lyon County, Nevada
Transportation in Churchill County, Nevada
Transportation in Pershing County, Nevada
Transportation in Humboldt County, Nevada
Transportation in Lander County, Nevada
Transportation in Eureka County, Nevada
Transportation in Elko County, Nevada